Al-Ankawi is a Syrian town located in the Ziyarah Subdistrict of the al-Suqaylabiyah District in Hama Governorate. According to the Syria Central Bureau of Statistics (CBS), al-Ankawi had a population of 2,298 in the 2004 census. Its inhabitants are predominantly Sunni Muslims.

References 

Populated places in al-Suqaylabiyah District
Populated places in al-Ghab Plain